The Adidas Finale is a brand of football made by Adidas. It is the current official football of the UEFA Champions League, Women's Champions League, and the Youth League; after Adidas took over the contract of official supplier from Nike in 2000. The internal and external design of the ball changes reflecting improvements to football technologies taken from other Adidas-produced footballs. The external design is the "Starball" based on the stars of the UEFA Champions League and the Women's Champions League logo. Each year's ball keeps the branding name of Adidas Finale, excepting suffixes to designate the year.

Usage 
During its introduction the Adidas Finale was only used in the latter stages of Champions League competition; it was not uncommon to see other balls in the early rounds, usually provided by the kit manufacturer or the ball supplier for the domestic league of the home team, including other Adidas balls. However, from 2006–07, the Adidas Finale had been used in all stages of the competition, including the play-off round which was introduced in 2009–10 followed with the group stages. The balls can also be seen in other UEFA competitions. These balls are also occasionally used in the UEFA Women's Champions League with similar graphics.

Construction

The ball is made by Adidas as the German brand took over the contract from Nike in 2000, and was firstly developed based on the Adidas Terrestra Silverstream, the official match ball of the UEFA Euro 2000 in the Netherlands and Belgium. This ball was also made with the same type of materials and construction used for the Adidas Fevernova, except, of course, the graphics.

The Finale ball incorporates a unique design that was inspired by the UEFA Champions League "starball" logo. The Finale is softer, faster, and more accurate than any other Adidas football before and it also features a layer of highly compressed, gas-filled micro-balloons of equal size (syntactic foam), proven during Euro 2000 and probably contributing to one of the highest average goal rates in a major tournament.

Until the final of the 2005–06 season, the Finale used the traditional truncated icosahedron panel design for their balls. From then on the panels are the same as the Adidas Teamgeist ball. From 2004–05, the ball structure was the same as the Adidas Roteiro balls used for UEFA Euro 2004, which had thermally bonded panels.

Since the 2010 final, the panels took the shape of the competition's starball logo. The panels design has been revised in 2019, previously connected on the edges, the panels now overlap to improve durability.

Design
Each season in the Champions League, the colour of the stars on the ball is changed. The first ball, in 2000–01 was silver, followed by black in 2001–02, then dark blue in 2003–04, and red in 2004–05. This was followed by light blue in 2005–06. The design for next season's ball was used in this season's final. A light blue ball was used for most of the 2005–06 season, but in the final between Arsenal and FC Barcelona, held in the Stade de France, Paris it was replaced by a ball with the same paneling as the Adidas +Teamgeist but decorated with pink stars. For the 2006–07 season, the ball had grey stars trimmed in red and white and the Finale Athens ball is a chrome silver metallic with royal blue and white. For the 2007–08 season, the ball was decorated in tangerine orange and black stars with grey trim. For the final of the 2007–08 season in Moscow, the ball was gray and red stars with a gold trim, while the ball's paneling was still same with +Teamgeist, but with PSC-Texture which based on Adidas Europass. The match ball used for the 2008–09 season was black and white with a green trim. For 2009–10, the starball's based panels was being used.

Champions League final variants
Each match ball intended for use in the final is marked with the location at which the final match is to be played. For example, the 2004–05 Champions League final was held in Istanbul, Turkey and as such, the blue/silver-starred Finale balls were marked with Istanbul.

From 2006–07 to 2010–11, the Champions League holder played with the match ball used in the previous final in their home games. Since 2011–12, the final ball has been used from the round of 16, with the title holders using the regular ball in their home group stage games.

Collectors' items
These official match balls are well prized. The UEFA Champions League is thought to be the most prestigious club competition and the ball itself has a very unusual design which makes the ball unique, FIFA Approved with highest rating, and fairly cherishable.

List of balls

References

External links

 Adidas Finale  on Soccer Ball World

Finale
UEFA Champions League
Products introduced in 2001